Dolly Niemiec (May 27, 1931 – September 22, 2018) was an American baseball player who played in the All-American Girls Professional Baseball League between 1948 and 1952. She both batted and threw right-handed.

Early baseball beginnings
Dolly learned how to play baseball—like a lot of her peers—from the boys with whom she grew up in her Chicago neighborhood, running around outside getting dirty and bruised just like all the boys were used to doing.  She earned the nickname "Dolly Gopher" because when playing softball with her father, he would say "Dolly, go for this ball. Go for that ball."

She recalled how the neighborhood boys would "play in a huge lot behind a factory.  We used sickles to cut the grass and cardboard boxes for the bases. Then we put big rocks on them so that they wouldn’t blow away.”.  Of the boys she played with she recalls, "their sisters had the most beautiful dolls.I had the most beautiful bats and balls."

One day, when she was 15 years old, Dolly's father came across a newspaper article about tryouts in a women's baseball league.  Her first reaction however was "girls don't play baseball."  It wasn't that she believed that girls couldn't play baseball, she just wasn't aware of any who did.

Despite this, she came along to the field and was "amazed" at how many women she saw there.  She said that she "thought [she] was the only girl in the city who played baseball."

Dolly's professional baseball career
Dolly played second base and third base for the Chicago Colleens (in 1948), the Springfield Sallies (in 1949), the Battle Creek Belles (in 1951), and between 1950 and 1952, the Grand Rapids Chicks. After making it in the minor leagues, Dolly joined the 1949 barnstorming tour that allocated minor league players to the major league. She began with the New Orleans tour, then to Florida and up the East Coast.

After baseball
In 1952, an auto accident resulted in Dolly's early retirement.  Following that, she became a professional bowler, coaching her sons' Little League teams, as well as being an umpire for high school baseball and softball games.

A league of their own
When the movie was released in 1992, Dolly actually  had a role in it.  Regarding the movie that starred Madonna, Dolly says: "Madonna was great. She was in the outfield changing into spikes, I asked her to sign a visor for me and she did.  The entire experience of that movie changed my life for the better."

Dolly died on September 22, 2018.

Career statistics

Sources
1. AAGPBL 
2. The St. Augustine Record 
3. YouTube 

1931 births
2018 deaths
Baseball players from Chicago
All-American Girls Professional Baseball League players
21st-century American women